Jordan Field (formerly called Soldiers Field Soccer Stadium)  is a multi-purpose stadium on the campus of Harvard University in the Allston neighborhood of Boston. (Although the core of the Harvard campus is in Cambridge, the athletic complex lies within Boston.)

It first opened in September 2010 and replaced Ohiri Field as the primary home of the Harvard Crimson men's and women's soccer teams.

It hosted a 2010 playoff match for the Boston Breakers of the Women's Professional Soccer league due to conflicts with the team's former primary home, Harvard Stadium.

In June 2013, the New England Revolution played host to the New York Red Bulls in a US Open Cup Round-of-16 game, marking the first time in Revolution history the team played a game within the Boston city limits.

Renovations were completed in early 2015, and it was the official home stadium and training venue of the Boston Breakers from 2015 to 2017.

Footnotes

External links
Soldiers Field Soccer Stadium. Men's Soccer. Harvard University Athletics official website

Lacrosse venues in Massachusetts
Soccer venues in Massachusetts
Harvard University buildings
Harvard Crimson
Multi-purpose stadiums in the United States
Sports venues completed in 2010
Former National Women's Soccer League stadiums
Sports venues in Boston
Harvard University
Boston Breakers
2010 establishments in Massachusetts
College lacrosse venues in the United States
College soccer venues in the United States